The Election Commission of Pakistan (ECP) is an independent, autonomous, permanent and constitutionally established federal body responsible for organizing and conducting elections to the national parliament, provincial legislatures, local governments, and the office of President of Pakistan, as well as the delimitation of constituencies and preparation of electoral rolls. As per the principles outlined in the Constitution of Pakistan, the Commission makes such arrangements as needed to ensure that the election is conducted honestly, justly, fairly and in accordance with law, and that corrupt practices are guarded against. The Election Commission was formed on 23 March 1956 and has been restructured and reformed several times throughout the history of Pakistan.

The Chief Election Commissioner and four retired judges of the High Courts, each from one of the four provinces (Punjab, Sindh, Balochistan and Khyber Pakhtunkhwa) of the country, form the five-member panel of the Election Commission.  The current Chief Election Commissioner is Sikandar Sultan Raja. The General Elections 2018 were performed under the Elections Act 2017, which was passed by the National Assembly on 2 October 2017.

ECPs bureaucracy is headed by Federal Secretary ECP (BPS-22) officer who manages the ECP Secretariat.

Function and duties
The functions and duties of the Election Commission of Pakistan (ECP) are defined and set by the Constitution of Pakistan in Article 219, which charges the commission with the following duties: 
 To prepare electoral rolls for elections to the National and Provincial Assemblies and revising such rolls annually [Article 219 (a)];
 To organize and conduct election to the Senate and fill casual vacancies in a House or a Provincial Assembly [Article 219(b)];
 To organize and conduct election to the Local Government institutions [Article 140(A)];
 To appoint Election Tribunals. [Article 219 (c)];
 To decide cases of disqualification of members of Parliament and Provincial Assemblies under [Article 63(2)]; and [Article 63(A)]; of the Constitution on receipt of reference from the Chairman or the Speaker or Head of the political party, as the case may be;
 To hold and conduct election to the office of the President as per Second Schedule to the Constitution of the Islamic Republic of Pakistan [Article 41 (3)];
 To hold Referendum as and when ordered by the President. [Article 48 (6)]

Autonomy and independence

The Commission retains full financial autonomy and independence from all government control.  Without government interference, the commission performs its functions and conduct of nationwide general elections, as well as for the by-elections decided by the Election Commission itself. The commission also prepares polling schemes, appoints polling personnel, assigns voters and arranges for the maintenance of law and order.

In its ruling in the case Election Commission v. Javed Hashmi, the Supreme Court held that "in the election matters the Election Tribunals which are to be appointed by the Chief Election Commissioner" have exclusive jurisdiction and the jurisdiction of all courts in such matters was excluded.  However, this is subject to an exception when there is no legal remedy is available to an aggrieved party during the process of election or after its completion and is against an order of an election functionary which is patently illegal jurisdiction, the effect of which is to disenfranchise a candidate. In such a case, candidate can press into service Constitutional jurisdiction of the High Court. The Supreme Court of Pakistan has since then consistently followed this judgment.

Members

Transaction of business
The commission transacts its business by holding meetings. All members of the Election Commission have equal status and say in the decisions of the Commission.

Judicial review
Judicial review of the decisions of the Election Commission can be sought in the High Court and the Supreme Court of Pakistan if the order suffers from a jurisdictional defect or is mala fide—in bad faith—or is coram non judice, that is, performed without jurisdiction.

Budget and expenditure
The budget of the Election Commission is provided by the federal government.

Any re-appropriation within the sanctioned budget can be done by the Chief Election Commissioner without making any reference to the Finance Division.

Funds required for preparation of electoral rolls and the conduct of General Elections and by-elections are provided in lump sum by the Finance Division according to the requirements of the Election Commission.

Further distribution of funds to the various functionaries is done with the approval of the Chief Election Commissioner.

See also
 Chief Election Commissioner of Pakistan
 Elections in Pakistan
 List of Members of The Election Commission of Pakistan
 Election Commission Gilgit-Baltistan
 Azad Jammu & Kashmir Election Commission

References

External links
 
Elections Act 2017

 
Pakistan
1956 establishments in Pakistan
Regulatory authorities of Pakistan